Bingley Three Rise Locks is a staircase of three locks on the Leeds and Liverpool Canal at Bingley, West Yorkshire, England.  The locks are a Grade II* listed building.

The locks were designed by John Longbotham and opened in 1774. The stone locks are still operational and underwent major refurbishment including the installation of new lock gates in 2015.

History

The Leeds and Liverpool Canal is a canal in Northern England, linking the cities of Leeds and Liverpool. The canal was planned by James Brindley and authorised by an Act of Parliament in 1768.

The Bingley Three Rise Locks opened in 1774 and was a major feat of engineering at the time along with the larger Five Rise opened at the same time and several hundred metres further up. They were designed by John Longbotham and  consist of a staircase flight – the lower gate of one lock forming the upper gate of the next lock.

In 1985 the locks were designated Grade II* listed status. They are built with stone retaining walls with steps to enable access for those opening the lock gates. There is an overflow channel for the water connecting each of the locks.

In 2007 the lock gates were refurbished with full replacement of the gates taking place in December 2015. Hand-crafted English oak gates made at Stanley Ferry in Wakefield and weighing  were swung into place on the locks in a £3.5 million modernisation programme.

See also

 Grade II* listed buildings in Bradford
 Listed buildings in Bingley
 Bingley Five Rise Locks

References

External links
 Pennine Waterways

Canals in Bradford
Grade II* listed buildings in West Yorkshire
Staircase locks of England
Tourist attractions in the City of Bradford
Locks of Yorkshire
Buildings and structures in Bingley